The first cycle of the reality television show Asia's Next Top Model in which a number of women compete for the title and a chance to begin their career in the modeling industry. The show features aspiring models from the entire Asia-Pacific region. The international destinations for this cycle were Batam, Indonesia and Hong Kong. 
 
The cycle featured 14 contestants from the China, Hong Kong, India, Indonesia, Japan, Malaysia, Nepal, Philippines, Singapore, South Korea, Taiwan, Thailand, and Vietnam. This is notably the only cycle to feature a contestant from Nepal. 

The show was filmed in Singapore, and it premiered globally on November 25, 2012 on STAR World.

The prize package for this cycle included a modeling contract with Storm Model Management, an all-expenses-paid trip to London, a chance to be the cover feature in Harper's Bazaar Singapore, a position as the face of Canon IXUS' 2013 campaign, a S$100,000 cash prize, and a Subaru XV.

The winner of the competition was 26-year-old Jessica Amornkuldilok, from Thailand.

Auditions
Casting calls were held in four countries, listed below:
July 16 at JW Marriott, Kuala Lumpur 
July 18 at JW Marriott, Jakarta  
July 20 at Siam Discovery, Bangkok
July 22 at FOX International Studios, Singapore City

Cast

Contestants
(Ages stated are at start of contest)

Judges
 Nadya Hutagalung (host) 
 Joey Mead King
 Daniel Boey
 Todd Anthony Tyler

Episodes

Results

 The contestant was eliminated
 The contestant quit the competition
 The contestant was absent at elimination and was safe
 The contestant was part of a non-elimination bottom two
 The contestant won the competition

Average  call-out order
Episode 13 is not included.

Bottom two

 The contestant withdrew from the competition before the elimination ceremony
 The contestant was eliminated after their first time in the bottom two
 The contestant was eliminated after their second time in the bottom two 
 The contestant was eliminated after their third time in the bottom two
 The contestant was eliminated and placed as a runner-up

Makeovers
Aastha: Rihanna inspired cut
Bei Si: Cut to neck length with bangs and dyed blue black
Filantropi: Bob cut with bangs and dyed deep red
Helena: Victoria Beckham inspired bob cut with blonde highlights
Jee: Trimmed with bangs and dyed light red
Jessica: Cut short and dyed chestnut brown
Kate: Layered and dyed honey blonde
Melissa: Cut to shoulder length with bangs and dyed brown with highlights
Rachel: Selita Ebanks inspired  cut and dyed brown
Sofia: Dyed jet black
Stephanie: Volumized curls and dyed red
Trang: Cut shorter

Notes

References

External links
 Official website (archive at the Wayback Machine)
 Asia's Next Top Model on Star World (archive at the Wayback Machine)
 Official website of Ice-TV (archive at the Wayback Machine)

Asia's Next Top Model
2012 Singaporean television seasons
2013 Singaporean television seasons
Television shows filmed in Singapore
Television shows filmed in Indonesia
Television shows filmed in Hong Kong